The Uniform Parentage Act is a legislative act originally promulgated in 1973 by the National Conference of Commissioners of Uniform State Laws. It was amended in 2002 and in 2017. The most recent changes are reflected in the 2017 version of the Uniform Parentage Act. The Act serves to provide a uniform legal framework for establishing paternity of minor children born to married and unmarried couples. It allows more than two people to be legally recognized as parents.

References